Connie Francis sings Fun Songs For Children is a studio album of children's songs recorded by American pop singer Connie Francis. It is one of the few U. S. albums by Connie Francis to be released exclusively in mono. All songs were co-written by George Goehring who had provided Francis earlier that year with one of her biggest hits, Lipstick On Your Collar.

The album was originally released in November 1959 under the Catalogue number L 70126 on Lion Records, a subsidiary of Francis' label MGM Records. In March 1962 it was reassigned to MGM Records and given the catalog number E-4023. The album was subsequently released as a regular MGM Records Album with a newly designed cover.

In Britain, Francis' label distributor EMI gave the album an immediate release on the MGM label, catalog number MGM C 819, faithfully reproducing the Lion Records artwork.

Track listing

Side A

Side B

References

Connie Francis albums
1959 albums
MGM Records albums
Children's music albums